Bílsko is a municipality and village in Strakonice District in the South Bohemian Region of the Czech Republic. It has about 200 inhabitants.

Administrative parts
Villages of Netonice and Záluží are administrative parts of Bílsko.

References

Villages in Strakonice District